Mikhail Anatolyevich Svetlov (born Krutikov)  is a Russian bass known for the range and beauty of his voice as well as his acting ability. His voice was described by The Washington Post as a "titanic, all-encompassing bass". He was nominated for a 2003 Grammy Award for a recording of Stravinsky's Histoire du Soldat and is the first Russian bass ever to perform the title roles in Don Giovanni and The Flying Dutchman.

Debut 
Svetlov studied piano, choral conducting and graduated as a singer from Moscow Conservatory. International career began with a very prestigious and successful debut at the Wexford Festival. Since winning the prestigious Viotti International Competition, praised for his rare technique in the bel canto style, Svetlov was immediately admitted to the permanent troupe of the Bolshoi Theater, as a principal soloist. Numerous important engagements have included performances with the Bolshoi on their tour at New York's Metropolitan Opera  and critically acclaimed debuts at Teatro Alla Scala (La Scala) and Royal Albert Hall in London.

Recordings and collaborations 

His recordings of Rachmaninov's The Miserly Knight and Alexander Serov's Judith were honored by the Telerama Awards (French magazine for television, radio and music) in France. He is well known for his performances of Verdi's Requiem throughout the world, including Paris, Moscow, Tokyo, and Montreal. Mr. Svetlov performs frequently with Houston Grand Opera, Mephistopheles in Faust, Don Basilio in Il Barbiere di Siviglia and Dikoy in Katya Kabanova, with L'Opéra de Montréal, the title role in Boris Godunov, Prince Gremin in Eugene Onegin, with Florida Grand Opera. Svetlov has appeared with New York City Opera as the title role in Verdi's Attila, Basilio in Il Barbiere di Siviglia, Colline in La Bohème, Banquo in a new production of Macbeth and Lorenz in the first fully staged performance of Mathis der Maler in the United States.

Roles

Discography 
Svetlov's discography includes the world premiere of Rachmaninov's The Miserly Knight and Serov's Judith on Le Chant du Monde, Shostakovich's The Gamblers recorded by Capriccio on Delta Music and Prokofiev's Bethrothal in a Monastery recorded by Melodia on BMG Classics, Shostakovich's 14th Symphony on Virgin Classics, and Grammy nominated in 2003 Stravinsky's Histoire du Soldat on Koch International Classics.
"Russian Songs"(Mighty Five) recorded by Naxos in 2011.

Notes and references

Sources
Davis, Peter G., "The Agony and the Ecstasy", New York Magazine,  25 September 1995, pp. 114–115
Desmeules, Raynald, Review: Bluebeard's Castle/Erwartung, Opera de Quebec, Opera Canada, December 2008 (accessed via subscription 28 January 2010)
Johnson, Lawrence A., Review: Káta Kabanová, Florida Grand Opera, Opera News, June 2001
New Zealand Herald, "Russian soul with amazing bass", 20 August 2007 (accessed via subscription 28 January 2010)
Porter, Cecelia, "A Talented Toast to St. Petersburg", Washington Post, 19 April 2001, p. C9 (accessed via subscription 28 January 2010)
Walton, Kenneth, "International season kicks off with thrilling Russian fairytale", The Scotsman, 24 September 2004.
WNYC, Classical Grammy Nominations, 7 January 2003

External links
Mikhail Svetlov official website

Living people
American opera singers
American people of Russian descent
Russian opera singers
Operatic basses
American male musicians
Year of birth missing (living people)